Erich Irlstorfer (born 27 May 1970) is a German politician of the Christian Social Union in Bavaria (CSU) who has been serving as a member of the Bundestag from the state of Bavaria since 2013.

Political career 
Irlstorfer became a member of the Bundestag in the 2013 German federal election, representing the Freising district. In parliament, he has since been a member of the Committee on Health (since 2013) and the Subcommittee on Global Health (since 2018).

In the negotiations to form a coalition government under the leadership of Chancellor Angela Merkel following the 2017 federal elections, Irlstorfer was part of the working group on health policy, led by Hermann Gröhe, Georg Nüßlein and Malu Dreyer.

References

External links 

  
 Bundestag biography 

1970 births
Living people
Members of the Bundestag for Bavaria
Members of the Bundestag 2021–2025
Members of the Bundestag 2017–2021
Members of the Bundestag 2013–2017
People from Freising
Members of the Bundestag for the Christian Social Union in Bavaria